The Honda RC174 was a racing motorcycle built by Honda for the 350 cc class of Grand Prix motorcycle racing in the 1967 season. Based on the 250 cc class Honda RC166, it had less than 300 cc, yet won seven out of the eight races in the championship that year. Mike Hailwood won the world championship and Honda won the constructors title.

See also
1967 Grand Prix motorcycle racing season

RC174
Grand Prix motorcycles
Six-cylinder motorcycles